"Micro-kid" is a single released in October, 1983 by the British musical group Level 42 from their fourth studio album Standing in the Light.  The song is on the Polydor Record label POSP 643.  It ran for 5 weeks on the UK single charts and reached #37.

This song is included on the Level 42 collections Level Best, The Very Best of Level 42 and The Definitive Collection.

References

1983 singles
Level 42 songs
Songs written by Mark King (musician)
Songs written by Phil Gould (musician)
Songs written by Wally Badarou
Polydor Records singles
1983 songs